The Gendarmerie Special Public Security Command or shortly as JÖAK, is the tactical unit of the Gendarmerie General Command. It has several missions which include counter-terrorist actions, underwater operations, hostage rescue, riot control, and other high-threat criminal actions. Members of the unit receive extensive training at the Jandarma School at Foça and also from selected Army instructors. All teams companies work under the direction of the police and gendarmerie regions to which they are assigned, but can also receive tasking from the Jandarma Headquarters in Ankara.Its role is similar to that of its French counterpart, GIGN.

Equipment

Handguns
 Beretta 92
 Glock 19
 Canik TP series

Submachine Guns
 FN P90
 HK MP5A3
 SAR-109T

Assault Rifles
 MPT-76
 KCR-556
 MPT-55
 HK 33

Sniper Rifles
 SR-25
 Armalite M-15T(4)
 IMI Galatz
 Accuracy International AWM
 MKEK JNG-90
 Robar RC-50
 PSL (rifle)

References

Special forces of Turkey
Gendarmerie (Turkey)